Fishy Tales is a 1937 Our Gang short comedy film directed by Gordon Douglas. It was the 157th Our Gang short (158th episode, 69th talking short, and 70th talking episode) that was released.

Cast

The Gang
 Eugene Lee as Porky
 George McFarland as Spanky
 Carl Switzer as Alfalfa
 Billie Thomas as Buckwheat
 Gary Jasgur as Junior

Additional cast
 Tommy Bond as Butch
 Sidney Kibrick as Woim
 Darla Hood as Darla

Audience extras
John Collum, Barbara Goodrich, Darwood Kaye, Tommy McFarland, Billy Minderhout, Dickie De Nuet, Harold Switzer

See also
 Our Gang filmography

References

External links

1937 films
American black-and-white films
1937 comedy films
Films directed by Gordon Douglas
Metro-Goldwyn-Mayer short films
1937 short films
Our Gang films
1930s American films